Pražské schody (Prague Stairs) is a specific cycling race held every year since 1994 in capital city of Czech Republic, Prague. The race specificity is the fact that cyclists riding down stairs (190 stairs) in Prague Castle and then climb back of cobblestones to the top. They do this for 1 hour + last circle.

Many top cyclists took part in this popular race Miguel Martinez, Julien Absalon, Daniele Pontoni, Thomas Frischknecht, Jaroslav Kulhavý etc.

Results

References

External links
  - Official site

 
Cyclo-cross races
Cycle races in the Czech Republic
Recurring sporting events established in 1994
1994 establishments in the Czech Republic